St. Aloysius' College is a boys' high school located in Galle, the capital city of Southern Province in Sri Lanka. The school was established in 1895 by recently arrived Belgian Jesuit missionaries, led by Joseph Van Reeth, first bishop of Galle. St. Aloysius' College is a national school, which provides primary and secondary education. In 2012, it had 4,000 students on its roll.

History 
St. Aloysius' College is situated on Mount Calvary, neighbouring St. Mary's Cathedral on one side and Sacred Heart Convent on the other. The college was established in 1895 by Belgian Jesuit fathers and was named after the Jesuit Saint, Saint Aloysius Gonzaga. St. Aloysius' College, Galle, is one of many schools named St Aloysius' College.

Until the Sri Lankan government passed legislation for the nationalisation of schools in the island (with an exception of only a few schools), St. Aloysius' College was run by Jesuit Fathers and the medium of instruction was English. The first Buddhist principal was appointed in the year 1971 and subsequently the medium of instruction was changed to Sinhala.

College today 

The college provides education to 5000 students from grade 1 to grade 13. The students of the school fall into diverse religious groups where over 90 percent of students are Buddhists and the others are Christian (or Catholic) and Muslim.

College Crest's elements 
Center:IHS –  Iesus Hominum Salvator("Jesus Saviour of Mankind") 
1. The Tusker – Courage 
2.Lilies – Purity of conscience
3.Torch – Torch of learning
4.Rooster – Symbol of Galle

College houses 
Students represent five houses that are named after Jesuit Fathers who were pioneers in developing the school in its early days.
Students are divided into houses according to their admission number.

-Cooreman
-Murphy
-Neut
-Standaert
-Vanreeth

Sports 

Sports is a major part of St. Aloysius’ College. Cricket, Basketball, Rugby, Football, Hockey and Swimming are some of the sports among over 20 sports in College. Among all of them, Rugby takes a prominent role as it has a history starting from 1980s. As a foot step of that, with the motto ‘‘ Born with the Stuff ’’ Rugby was introduced at St. Aloysius’ in latter part of 1980s. The first historic match was played in 1992 against Richmond College. Taking centre stage of the annual sporting calendar are the St. Aloysius' - Richmond Rugby Encounter.

Principals

Old Boys' associations 

There are a number of branches of the school's Old Boys’ Association located all around the world, including Australia, New Zealand, Qatar and the United Kingdom.

Notable alumni

See also 
 Saint Aloysius Gonzaga
 List of Jesuit sites

References

External links 
 

1895 establishments in Ceylon
Boys' schools in Sri Lanka
Educational institutions established in 1895
National schools in Sri Lanka
Schools in Galle